Andrew Cant (born 1899) was a Scottish professional footballer who played as a centre forward.

Career
Born in Glasgow, Cant played for East Fife and Bradford City. For Bradford City, he made 14 appearances in the Football League, scoring three goals; he also made 1 appearance in the FA Cup.

Sources

References

1899 births
Year of death missing
Scottish footballers
East Fife F.C. players
Bradford City A.F.C. players
English Football League players
Association football forwards